Luve is a town in central Eswatini (Swaziland). It is located on the MR5 route between Mpisi and Mliba, 25 kilometres northeast of Manzini.

References
Fitzpatrick, M., Blond, B., Pitcher, G., Richmond, S., and Warren, M. (2004)  South Africa, Lesotho and Swaziland. Footscray, VIC: Lonely Planet.

Populated places in Manzini Region